Pinus rzedowskii, commonly known as Rzedowski's pine, is a species of conifer in the pine family, Pinaceae.

It is endemic to western Michoacán state, in southwestern Mexico.

References

External links
 

rzedowskii
Endemic flora of Mexico
Trees of Michoacán
Taxonomy articles created by Polbot